The Priabonian is, in the ICS's geologic timescale, the latest age or the upper stage of the Eocene Epoch or Series. The Priabonian is preceded by the Bartonian and is followed by the Rupelian, the lowest stage of the Oligocene.

Stratigraphic definition
The Priabonian Stage was introduced in scientific literature by Ernest Munier-Chalmas and Albert de Lapparent in 1893. The stage is named after the small hamlet of Priabona in the community of Monte di Malo, in the Veneto region of northern Italy.

The base of the Priabonian Stage is at the first appearance of calcareous nannoplankton species Chiasmolithus oamaruensis (which forms the base of nanoplankton biozone NP18). An official GSSP was ratified in 2020, and was placed in the Alano di Piave section in Alano di Piave, Belluno, Italy.

The top of the Priabonian Stage (the base of the Rupelian Stage and Oligocene Series) is at the extinction of foram genus Hantkenina.

Sometimes local rock strata cannot be correlated in sufficient detail with the ICS timescale, and stratigraphers often use regional timescales as alternatives to the ICS timescale. The Priabonian overlaps for example the upper Johannian and lowers Aldingan stages of the Australian timescale or the upper Nanzian and lower Refugian stages of the Californian timescale. Other regional stages which are more or less coeval with the Priabonian include the Jacksonian of the southeastern US and Runangan of New Zealand.

In biostratigraphy, the Priabonian Stage is coeval with the Chadronian North American Land Mammal Age, the Headonian European Land Mammal Mega Zone (in more detail: with the Mammal Paleogene zones 17A through 20), parts of the Barrancan and Mustersan South American Land Mammal Ages and the Ulangochuian and Ergilian Asian Land Mammal Ages.

References

Literature

; 2004: A Geologic Time Scale 2004, Cambridge University Press.
; 1893: Note sur la nomenclature des terrains sédimentaires, Bulletin de la Société Géologique de France 3(21), p. 479-480.

External links
GeoWhen Database - Priabonian
Paleogene timescale, at the website of the subcommission for stratigraphic information of the ICS
Stratigraphic chart of the Paleogene, at the website of Norges Network of offshore records of geology and stratigraphy

 
Eocene geochronology
 
Geological ages